Tunisia, participated at the 1978 All-Africa Games held in Algiers, Algeria. She won 63 medals.

Medal summary

Medal table

See also
 Tunisia at the All-Africa Games

References

1978 All-Africa Games
1978
1978 in Tunisian sport